The ZEC Pontiac is a "zone d'exploitation contrôlée" (controlled harvesting zone) (ZEC) located in Pontiac Regional County Municipality, in the province of Quebec, in Canada.

The ZEC is managed by the "Association de la réserve Pontiac inc". The administrative office is located in Gracefield, Quebec. Rates vary depending on the activity and duration, and may be obtained through the office.

ZEC Pontiac is located in the Outaouais region in the western part of the province. It is mainly a hunting and fishing area with recreational tourism activities.

Geography 

The ZEC territory covers an area of 1205 km². It straddles the Pontiac Regional County Municipality and La Vallée-de-la-Gatineau Regional County Municipality.

Hydrography 

The territory of the ZEC contains 350 lakes for fishing brook trout, golden, trout and pike. Brodtkorb Lake is the busiest lake for speckled trout (brook trout) in the Outaouais region.

Wildlife 

Smaller wildlife species are abundant and include gray squirrels, raccoons, skunks, beaver, loons and many other birds. Hunting seasons in the ZEC vary according to hunting gear, sex of animals (moose) and quotas for the following species: moose, white-tailed deer, black bear, hare and grouse.

This ZEC restricts the use of gasoline engines on some lakes. Winter fishing is allowed on these lakes: McNally, Depot, Evan, Gloria, Herman, Leblanc and Trump (porcupine).

Quotas for fishing apply to the following species: brook trout, lake trout, pike, walleye and bass.

Tourism 

ZEC Pontiac offers various outdoor activities including mountain biking, cycling, canoeing, camping, hiking, hunting, and fishing. Lakes David and Pythonga offer beaches. 
 
Gathering wild fruits (blueberries, raspberries and blackberries) is popular in July and August.

Several rustic or equipped campgrounds are available for rental in the ZEC, as well as individual cottages and shelters.

Related articles

 Gracefield, a municipality of Outaouais region
 Pontiac Regional County Municipality
 La Vallée-de-la-Gatineau Regional County Municipality
 Zone d'exploitation contrôlée (Controlled harvesting zone) (ZEC)

References

Attachments

External links 
  of the ZEC Pontiac.
 ZEC Pontiac Tourist Info Main Page

Protected areas of Outaouais
Protected areas established in 1978
1978 establishments in Quebec